Jhonny Serrudo Quispe (born 14 September 1981) is a Bolivian football manager and former player. He is the current manager of Petrolero.

Career
He started his managerial career with the same club in the same year, and subsequently managed  in the 2018 season.

Serrudo was appointed manager of Fancesa in 2019, narrowly missing out promotion in 2020. He took over Universitario de Sucre in 2021, and renewed with the club after leading them to the Primera División.

On 1 May 2022, Serrudo was sacked by La "U".

References

External links

1981 births
Living people
People from Sucre
Bolivian footballers
Club Independiente Petrolero players
Club San José players
Nacional Potosí players
Bolivian football managers
Bolivian Primera División managers
Universitario de Sucre managers
Club Petrolero managers